Makamba may refer to:

People:
 James Makamba
 January Makamba
 Yusuf Makamba
 Zororo Makamba

Place:
 Makamba Province, Burundi
 Makamba Commune, Burundi
 Makamba, Burundi